Ladino, derived from Latin, may refer to:

 The register of Judaeo-Spanish used in the translation of religious texts, such as the Ferrara Bible

Ladino people, a socio-ethnic category of Mestizo or Hispanicized people in Central America especially in Guatemala
Black ladinos, a historical ethnic community in Medieval Spain
Ladin language (ISO 639–3 lld), a Romance language spoken in Northern Italy, known in Italian as Ladino
Ladino (surname)
Ladino (rural locality), a rural locality (a village) in Novorzhevsky District of Pskov Oblast, Russia
Ladino, a hardy type of large white clover, often grown as a forage crop
Ladino poem, a 19th-century Philippine poetry style

See also
Ladina, a village in Croatia
Latino (disambiguation)

Language and nationality disambiguation pages